Ionel is a Romanian masculine given name.

People named Ionel

Ionel Augustin (born 1955), retired Romanian footballer
Ionel Averian (born 1976), Romanian sprint canoeist
Ionel Constantin (born 1963), Romanian sprint canoeist
Ionel Dănciulescu (born 1976), Romanian football player
Ionel Fernic (1901–1938), Romanian composer, aviator and writer
Ionel Gane (born 1971), retired Romanian football player
Ionel Ganea (born 1973), Romanian football striker
Ionel Igorov, Romanian sprint canoeist
Ionel Letcae (born 1961), Romanian sprint canoeist
Ionel Pârvu (born 1970), Romanian former football player
Ionel Perlea (1900–1970), Romanian conductor
Ionel Sânteiu, Romanian former tennis player
Ionel Schein (1927–2004), French architect
Ionel Sinescu (born 1951), Romanian physician
Ionel Teodoreanu (1897–1954), Romanian novelist and lawyer

See also
Eleny Ionel, Romanian mathematician
Ionel, the name of Iohanisfeld village, Otelec Commune, Timiș County, under the communist regime and until 2008.
Ion
Ionuț
Ioan
Valea lui Ionel River, headwater of the Sebeş River in Romania

Romanian masculine given names